Shaikhpara A.R.M. Polytechnic, is a government polytechnic located in Shaikhpara,  Murshidabad district, West Bengal.

About college
This polytechnic is affiliated to the West Bengal State Council of Technical Education,  and recognized by AICTE, New Delhi. This polytechnic offers diploma courses in Food Processing Technology, Computer Software Technology and Medical Lab Technology.

Official Website:http://polytechnic.wbtetsd.gov.in/sheikhparaarmpoly

See also

References

External links
 Admission to Polytechnics in West Bengal for Academic Session 2006-2007
 Know more about Sheikhpara ARM Polytechnic
Official website WBSCTE

Universities and colleges in Murshidabad district
Technical universities and colleges in West Bengal
2000 establishments in West Bengal
Educational institutions established in 2000